Johann Hartmann von Rosenbach (1609–1675) was the Prince-Bishop of Würzburg from 1673 to 1675.

Johann Hartmann von Rosenbach was born in Stammheim, Florstadt on 15 September 1609.

The cathedral chapter of Würzburg Cathedral elected him Prince-Bishop of Würzburg on 13 March 1673, with Pope Clement X confirming his appointment on 10 September 1674. He was consecrated as a bishop by Stephan Weinberger, auxiliary bishop of Würzburg on 6 January 1675.

During his time as Prince-Bishop, the Franco-Dutch War spilled into the Prince-Bishopric of Würzburg, with forces under Henri de la Tour d'Auvergne, Vicomte de Turenne invading the bishopric. These forces were eventually beaten back by troops under the command of Raimondo Montecuccoli.

He died on 19 April 1675.

References

Prince-Bishops of Würzburg
1609 births
1675 deaths